Baron Camelford, of Boconnoc, in the County of Cornwall, was a title in the Peerage of Great Britain. It was created, as Lord Camelford, Baron of Boconnoc, on 5 January 1784 for Thomas Pitt, who had previously represented Old Sarum and Okehampton in Parliament. A member of the famous Pitt family, he was the eldest son of Thomas Pitt of Boconnoc; a great-grandson of Thomas Pitt, President of Madras, who purchased Boconnoc House; a great-nephew of Thomas Pitt, 1st Earl of Londonderry; a nephew of William Pitt, 1st Earl of Chatham and first cousin of William Pitt the Younger. Lord Camelford was also the father-in-law of William Grenville, 1st Baron Grenville. The title became extinct on the death of his only son, the 2nd Baron, who was killed in a duel in 1804.

Barons Camelford (1784)
Thomas Pitt, 1st Baron Camelford (1737–1793)
Thomas Pitt, 2nd Baron Camelford (1775–1804)

See also
Earl of Londonderry (1726 creation)
Earl of Chatham

References

Extinct baronies in the Peerage of Great Britain
Pitt family
Cornish nobility
Noble titles created in 1784